The Dermatophilaceae is a Gram-positive family of bacteria placed within the order of Actinomycetales. Dermatophilaceae bacteria occur on animal and human skin and in fish guts.

Phylogeny
The currently accepted taxonomy is based on the List of Prokaryotic names with Standing in Nomenclature and the phylogeny is based on whole-genome sequences.

Notes

References

Further reading 
 
 

Micrococcales